Calliope Tsoupaki (born 27 May 1963) is a Greek pianist and composer.

Biography
Calliope Tsoupaki was born in Piraeus, Greece. She studied piano and music theory at the Hellinicon Conservatory in Athens and composition with Yannis Ioannidis. She continued her studies with Louis Andriessen at the Royal Conservatory in The Hague, and graduated in 1992.

After ending her studies, Tsoupaki settled in Amsterdam and began a career as a pianist and composer. Her works have been performed in Europe and in the United States and at international music festivals. In 1993 she lived and worked in Budapest on a three-month residency from the Pepinières Foundation for young artists. In 2007 she took a position teaching composition at Koninklijk Conservatorium.
Since 2018 Calliope Tsoupaki is the composer laureate of the Netherlands.

Works
Selected works include:
Enigma for viola solo (1999)
Medea (Μήδεια) for viola and 3 female voices (1996); words by Euripides
When I Was 27 (Στα 27 μου χρόνια) for viola and double bass (1990)
Music for Saxophones
Greek Love Songs
Vita Nova chamber opera for solo voice, baroque violin, viola da gamba and harpsichord
Sappho's Tears for female voice, tenor recorder and violin

Tsoupaki's works have been recorded and issued on CD including: 
Syrinx Saxophone Quartet
Calliope Tsoupaki: St. Luke's Passion Etcetera Records (2010)Vintage Brisk (2007)Thin Air (2020)Black Moon'' (2012) Trytone, 2022

References

External links
Calliope Tsoupaki website

1963 births
20th-century classical composers
21st-century classical composers
Women classical composers
Greek classical composers
Living people
Pupils of Louis Andriessen
20th-century women composers
21st-century women composers
Greek women classical composers
Musicians from Piraeus